The Cobbold family is a prominent family that flourished in Ipswich since the eighteenth century. They first became prominent for their involvement in the brewing industry, but subsequently became involved in other areas of trade, banking politics and the arts. They have also been prominent promoters of Ipswich Town Football Club.

Family members include:
 Thomas Cobbold (1680–1752), brewer
 Elizabeth Cobbold (1765–1824) 
 John Chevallier Cobbold (1797–1882)
 John Patteson Cobbold (1831–1875)
 Zainab Cobbold (1867–1963)
 John Cavendish Cobbold (1927–1983)
 Patrick Cobbold (1934–1994)

Family property

Related
 Baron Cobbold

 

 
Families from Suffolkshire